Trachypepla amphileuca is a species of moth in the family Oecophoridae. It is endemic to New Zealand and has been observed in the North Island. This species inhabits native forest. Adults are on the wing from October to January and are attracted to light. The wing pattern of T. amphileuca is said to imitate the appearance of bird droppings.

Taxonomy 
This species was first described in 1914 by Edward Meyrick and named Trachypepla amphileuca using a specimen collected in Wainuiomata by George Hudson in December. In 1928 George Hudson discussed and illustrated this species in his book The butterflies and moths of New Zealand. The male holotype specimen is held at the Natural History Museum, London.

Description

Meyrick described the adult male of the species as follows:
Hudson was of the opinion that the wing pattern of T. amphileuca imitates the appearance of bird droppings.

Distribution

This species is endemic to New Zealand and has been observed in the North Island. It has been observed or collected in the Wellington, Hawkes Bay, Waikato and Auckland regions. It has previously been regarded as scarce in the Hawkes Bay although in more recently published literature this species is said to be common in Albany, Auckland.

Habitat 
T. amphileuca inhabits native forest.

Behaviour 
Adults have been observed on the wing from October to January. Adults are attracted to light and have been collected using light traps.

References 

Moths described in 1914
Oecophorinae
Moths of New Zealand
Endemic fauna of New Zealand
Taxa named by Edward Meyrick
Endemic moths of New Zealand